Jatin Singh Bisht (born 15 November 1981) is an Indian former professional footballer who played as an attacking midfielder. During his playing career he played in the National Football League, I-League, and I-League 2nd Division with Salgaocar, Mahindra United, East Bengal,Mohammedan Sporting F.C  and ONGC. He was also capped 15 times by India from 2002 to 2005.

References

1981 births
Living people
People from Nainital
Indian footballers
Salgaocar FC players
Mahindra United FC players
East Bengal Club players
ONGC FC players
Association football midfielders
Footballers from Uttarakhand
National Football League (India) players
I-League players
I-League 2nd Division players
India international footballers